The Revue des colonies was a French journal published in Paris from 1834 to 1843 that campaigned for the abolition of slavery, particularly in the French colonies.

It was under the leadership of Cyrille Bissette (1795 to 1858), the politician and founder of the Société d'hommes de couleur.

The monthly journal gives an overview of the state of the French and foreign colonies at that time. The Revue des colonies is the first French abolitionist journal written by black people; it was to become the bane of the French planters, especially those of Martinique, whom Bissette never forgave throughout the July Monarchy for branding him with an iron and expelling him during the Bourbon Restoration. The first edition of July 1835 contains the bill formulated by the author for the immediate abolition of slavery.

See also 
 Society of the Friends of the Blacks

References

Literature 
 Lawrence C. Jennings: La France et l'abolition de l'esclavage. 2010

External links 
 Revue des colonies in Gallica
 
 
 
 

Publications disestablished in 1842
Colonialism
Publications established in 1834
19th century in Martinique
Slavery in Martinique
Magazines published in Paris
Abolitionism
Abolitionist newspapers